Thermosphaeroma is a genus of crustacean in family Sphaeromatidae. They occur exclusively in hot springs of southwestern United States and central Mexico.

Species
The genus contains eight species, most of which are listed on the IUCN Red List (EW: extinct in the wild; CR: critically endangered; EN: endangered; LC; least concern; NE: not evaluated):

References

Sphaeromatidae
Freshwater crustaceans of North America
Crustacean genera
Taxonomy articles created by Polbot